Aviapartner, whose origins date back to 1949 under the name of Herfurth Air Services to become 'Belgavia' in the late 1960s, is a Belgian company that provides  ground handling services at 37 airports in Belgium, France, Germany, Italy, Spain and The Netherlands. Among the airports served are Amsterdam, Brussels, Milan, Düsseldorf, Rome, Nice, Toulouse and Málaga .

History
In 1949, Belgavia was founded in Antwerp, Belgium. In the coming years, they expanded their services to the airports of Ostend (1957), Liège (1965) and Brussels (1970). It took until the 90's for the company to go international. Basis in France and later in Germany were opened. In 1999, the name was changed to Aviapartner. The group expanded by taking over Servisair in Rotterdam (2002), Aero Groundservices in Amsterdam (2007) and SAT in Bordeaux and La Rochelle (2010).

In 2011, Aviapartner lost its handling licence in Brussels for seven years to Swissport. This could lead to the loss of thousands of jobs and led to a major 24-hour strike in June 2011 that affected many flights and passengers.
Aviapartner went to court as they believed juridical mistakes had been made. The judge ruled that a new investigation was to be conducted and that, in the meantime, Aviapartner could continue operations at the airport. Before a new investigation was concluded, Swissport took over Flightcare, the other ground handling company at the airport. Note that only two handling licences are issued at the airport.

In 2012, Aviapartner announced a merge with the French Worldwide Flight Services (WFS), making them the biggest ground handler in Europe. This merge failed.

Range of ground handling services
Passenger handling:
Check-in, ticketing, boarding assistance, lost and found baggage services, assistance to disabled passengers, passenger ground transportation.
Ramp handling:
Loading and unloading of baggage and cargo to/from aircraft on the ramp, ground power provision for aircraft, cleaning, water and sanitary services, freight and baggage transfer to terminal, crew transfer from aircraft to terminal/hotel, pushback and towing, with headset, aircraft de-icing.
Traffic operations:
Preparation of flight documentation, ground to air communication, calculation of weight and balance, set-up of loadsheet, crew briefing, flight supervision.
Cargo handling:
Warehousing, palletizing, import and export procedures, customs clearance, trucking services.
Courier handling:
Transfer of courier and express shipments to/from other warehouses and aircraft, handling of express flights operated from the Brussels Airport Courier center.

Airports served by Aviapartner

Corporate Airlines at Amsterdam Airport Schiphol

Aegean Airlines
Air Arabia Maroc
Air Malta
Air Transat
Austrian Airlines
British Airways
Croatia Airlines
Flybe
Iberia Express
LOT Polish Airlines
Lufthansa
Royal Air Maroc
Surinam Airways
Swiss International Air Lines
Transavia (Ticketing services only)
Tunisair
Vueling

Corporate Airlines at Brussels Airport

Aegean Airlines
Aer Lingus
Air Algerie
Air Baltic
Air Belgium
Air Canada
Air Europa
Air France
Air Transat
Air Serbia
All Nippon Airways 
Austrian Airlines
Blue Air
British Airways
Croatia Airlines
Czech Airlines
EasyJet
Egyptair
El Al
Ethiopian Airlines
Etihad Airways
Eurowings
Finnair
Flyr
Freebird Airlines
Hainan Airlines
Iberia
KLM
Lufthansa
Meridiana
Middle East Airlines
Nouvelair
Onur Air
Pegasus Airlines
Play
Royal Air Maroc
Ryanair
Scandinavian Airlines
Sky Alps
Sky Express
SunExpress
Swiss
TAP Portugal
Thai Airways International
Transavia Airlines
TUI fly
Tunisair
Turkish Airlines
Ukraine International Airlines
Vueling

Corporate Airlines at Nice Airport

Aigle Azur
Air Transat
Austrian Airlines
Blu-Express
British Airways
Czech Airlines
DHL Aviation
Estonian Air
Europe Airpost
Finnair
Flybe
Germanwings
Iberia
IGAvion (SkyTaxi)
Jet2.com
KLM
Lufthansa
Middle East Airlines
Rossiya
Scandinavian Airlines
Syphax Airlines
Brussels Airlines
TAP Portugal
Transavia
Tunisair
Ukraine International Airlines
Vueling

Awards
Amsterdam Airport Schiphol presented Aviapartner with 'The Best Handler Award' in 2003, 2007, 2008 and 2009 for its excellent performance in the areas of service, safety and co-operation.

Aviapartner received the IATA Safety Audit for Ground Operations (ISAGO) registration for:
Amsterdam (December 2008)
Frankfurt (July 2009)
Düsseldorf (September 2009)
Munich (October 2009), Brussels (October 2009)
Milan-Malpensa (November 2009)
Nice (November 2009)
Lyon (December 2009)
Turin (May 2010)
Venice (June 2010)
Rotterdam (May 2011)

References

External links

 

Aircraft ground handling companies
Companies based in Brussels
Multinational companies headquartered in Belgium